She Never Knew is a 1915 American silent short drama film directed by Tom Ricketts. Starring  William Garwood in the lead role with Charlotte Burton.

Cast
Charlotte Burton   
William Garwood   
Louise Lester   
David Lythgoe   
Jack Richardson  
Vivian Rich   
Harry Van Meter

External links

1915 films
1915 drama films
Silent American drama films
American silent short films
American black-and-white films
1915 short films
Films directed by Tom Ricketts
1910s American films
1910s English-language films
American drama short films